Parenteau may refer to:

Donny Parenteau, singer-songwriter, multi-instrumentalist and record producer
Marc Parenteau (born 1980), professional Canadian football offensive lineman
P. A. Parenteau (born 1983), Canadian professional ice hockey right winger
Canadian politician, former Canadian politician

See also
Barentu (disambiguation)
Parentia